The discography of artist musician Henrik Nordvargr Björkk consists of many projects and collaborations, commonly known as Nordvargr.

Discography

Henrik Nordvargr Björkk

Description: dark ambient, experimental, drone

Some of the below were released under the name of Nordvargr only.
Awaken (CD 2002, CD 2003, CD 2011 as Re-Awaken, digital 2014 as Awaken (2014 Complete Version)) – both 2011 and 2014 editions are revamped, remixed, remastered and expanded
Enter Nordvargr (2×CD 2002) – compilation
On Broken Wings Towards Victory (CD 2003)
Rektal_dist 1.4 (CDR 2003)
Sleep Therapy (Electroencephalography Technology) (8×CD box set 2003) – limited to 300 copies
I End Forever (CD 2004)
Partikel (CD 2004) – collaboration with Merzbow
Enter Nordvargr 2 (digital 2005) – free download compilation from Nordvargr's official site
The Dead Never Sleep (CD 2005)
Vitagen (CD & box set 2005) – CD limited to 800 copies. Box set limited to 99 copies
Semen (CD 2006) – collaboration with Hentai
Hypergenome666 (2×CD & 2×CD + 2×3″CD + Book 2006) – collaboration with Beyond Sensory Experience and Kenji Siratori
In Oceans Abandoned by Life I Drown... To Live Again as a Servant of Darkness (CD & box set 2007)
For the Blood Is the Life (CD & CD+CD3″ 2007) 
Partikel II (CD 2007) – collaboration with Merzbow
Dronevessel (CDR 2008)
Helvete (Digipack CD 2008)
Interstellar (CD 2008)
Pyrrhula (CD 2008)
Evolution (2×CD 2009)
Untitled Navigations 1 (wooden box CD 2009, digital 2014 as Untitled Navigations Revisited) 
Interstellar 2 (CD 2009)
Avart – Music for Movement: The Complete Sessions (CD 2009)
A Wilderness of Cloades (CD 2010) – collaboration with Surachai
Resignation 2' (CDR 2010)The Walls Are Closing In (cassette 2010)Tyglad Best (LP 2011)Otyglad Best (digital 2011)Murkhr (LP/CD/cassette 2012)Music for N,N-Dimetyltryptamin (digital 2012)Uncertainties (digital EP 2012)Sirius Carmanor (12″ 2012)Partikel III (CD 2013) – collaboration with MerzbowThe Missing Link (digital 2013)The Dromopoda Transmissions (CD+DVD 2013)Artifacts from a Broken Core (digital 2013) – compilationWermland Atonal 1 (digital 2014)rEVOLUTION (digital 2014)For the Blood Is the Life – The Second Strain EP (digital 2014)Final Preparations (digital 2014) – rehearsals for the Nordvargr live experienceOriginome (digital 2015)Partiklar (digital 2015) – collaboration with MerzbowSet / Setting (digital 2015) – alternate version of the vinyl companion to the Murkhr releaseAnima Nostra (CD 2016) – collaboration with Margaux RenaudinAtra Acham (CD 2017)Totem (2018)Metempsychosis (2018)
Daath (2019)

Pouppée Fabrikk

Description: EBMRage (LP & CD 1990, CD 1994) Portent (LP & CD 1991)Betrayal (CD5″ 1992) Crusader (CD 1992)I Want Candy (CD5″ 1993)We Have Come to Drop Bombs (CD 1994)Djävulen (CD 1998)Your Pain – Our Gain (CD 1999)Elite Electronics (CD5″ 2001)The Dirt (2013)Armén (2020)Mz.412

Description: black industrial with strong anti-Christian context.Malfeitor (LP 1989, CD 2001) Macht Durch Stimme (CD 1990, CD 1994, 2×LP 2002, CD 2003, CD 2008) In Nomine Dei Nostri Satanas Luciferi Excelsi (CD 1995)Burning the Temple of God (LP & CD 1996) Nordik Battle Signs (LP & CD 1999) Legion Ultra (7″ 2000) Domine Rex Inferum' (CD 2001) 
Steel Night 29.11.01 (4×CD box 2003) 
Live Ceremony (CD 2004) 
Infernal Affairs (CD 2006)
Svartmyrkr (CD/DLP 2019)

Folkstorm

Description: power electronics with emphasis on political/historical issues.
Information Blitzkrieg (CD 1999, CD 2000)
Noisient (10″ 1999) 
Hurtmusic (CD 2000)
The Culturecide Campaigns (enhanced CDR & digital 2000, CD 2010 as Archive Series 5 – The Culturecide Campaigns) 
Victory or Death (CD 2000, remastered CD 2009) 
Folkstorm vs. Goat (split 7″ 2001)
Archive Series Volume 1 (CDR 2001) 
Archive Series Volume 2 (CDR 2001) 
Archive Series Volume 3 (CDR 2001)
For the Love of Hate (CD 2002) 
Sweden (CD 2004, remastered CD 2009)
Live Ceremony (CD 2004, remastered CD 2015) 
Folkmusik (CD & CD+CD3″ 2005) 
The Forgotten Tapes (Archive Series 4 1997–2000) (CD & CD3″, CD & 2×CD3″ box set 2008)
Ortodox (CD & box set 2009)
Folksongs (CD & CD3″ box set 2011)
Live at Tower Transmissions III (digital 2013)
Nihil Total (CD-2019)

Econocon

Description: noise 
Business Solutions for the Active Terrorist (CD 2000)

Toroidh

Description: militant, sound landscapes of WWII
Those Who Do Not Remember the Past Are Condemned To Repeat (LP & CD 2001) 
Europe Is Dead (LP & CD 2001) 
Toroidh Box (CDR EP 2001) – box set with an exclusive T-shirt and a card. The box is limited to 10 copies 
Europe Is Dead.6.Extended (picture 7″ 2001)
For the Fallen Ones (7″ & box set 2002) 
The Return of Yesterday (10″ 2002) – split with Solaris
Start Over (2×7″ 2003)
Testament (LP & CD 2003, remastered CD 2006 as The Final Testament) 
Offensiv! (CD 2004) – compilation
United in Blood (CD 2004) – collaboration with Arditi
European Trilogy (3×CD box set 2006) 
Toroidh (7″ 2007) 
Segervittring (Digipack CD & box set 2007)
Eine Kleine Marschmusik (CDR 2009) – compilation
In Memoriam – Karl Ohlén (digital 2011)
Alliance Proditorum (7″ 2014)
Etos (digital 2015) – compilation

Hydra Head Nine

The last two albums were released under the name of HH9

Description: noise
Kod (CD 2002)
Power Display (CD 2002)
Heat (CD 2004)

Nordvargr / Drakh

Description: dark ambient
Cold Void of Nothing (CD 2002)
Northern Dark Supremacy (LP 2003) 
Infinitas in Aeternum (CD 2004)
The Betrayal of Light (CD 2007)
The Less You Know, the Better (CD 2008) – collaboration with Klier

Thee Maldoror Kollective

New Era Vital Order (CD 2002)
A Clockwork Highway (CD 2004)
23 Miles Back on the Clockwork Highway (CD 2005)
Knownothingism （CD 2014）

Muskel

Seven Days of Pain (CD 2003)

Naer Mataron

Description: Greek black metal
River at Dash Scalding (CD 2003)
Discipline Manifesto (CD 2005)
Aghibasiin-Lessons on How to Defeat Death (2×LP 2006) 
Praetorians (CD 2008)

Incinerator International

Head On (CD 2004)

L/A/B

Psychoacoustics (CD 2004)

Goatvargr

Description: blackened noise
Goatvargr (CD 2006) – limited to 1000 copies
Black Snow Epoch (CD 2010)

Vargr

Description: satanoise
Wehrmacht Satanas (CD 2007)
Northern Black Supremacy (CD 2007)
The Twice High Holy Secret of Constant Generation (demo CDR 2008)
Storm of Northern Evil (CD 2008)
Aldebaran (CDR 2009)
Orsic Descending / Ave Maria (2×CDR 2009)
The Maria Orsic Trilogy (digital 2009, digital 2015)
Armatus / Vargr (7″ 2010) – split with Armatus
Mors Omnia Solvit (CDR 2010)

Marvargr

Description: satanoise
Likstank (CD 2008, digital 2015) – CD is limited to 666 copies

Körperwelten

Description: avant garde noise with SM attitude
Avatars of Rape and Rage (Digipak CD 2008, digital 2015)

All Hail the Transcending Ghost

All Hail the Transcending Ghost (CD 2009, digital 2015)

Resignation

1897 (CD 2009)

Nexus Kenosis

Elsewhen (CD 2012, CD & CDR EP 2012)
Further (digital EP 2013) – featuring Labanna Babalon

Angst

Tar Ner Skylten (CD 2014)

Kongo 
Collaboration with Peter Nyström

Blubber (CD 2016)

Anima Nostra 

 Atraments (CD 2017, cassette 2018)

References

Discographies of Swedish artists
Electronic music discographies